San Bernardino County, officially the County of San Bernardino, is a county located in the southern portion of the U.S. state of California, and is located within the Inland Empire area. As of the 2020 U.S. Census, the population was 2,181,654, making it the fifth-most populous county in California and the 14th-most populous in the United States. The county seat is San Bernardino.

While included within the Greater Los Angeles area, San Bernardino County is included in the Riverside–San Bernardino–Ontario metropolitan statistical area, as well as the Los Angeles–Long Beach combined statistical area.

The county is close to the size of West Virginia.

This vast county stretches from where the bulk of the county population resides in three Census County Divisions (Fontana, San Bernardino, and Victorville-Hesperia), counting 1,793,186 people as of the 2010 Census, covering 1,730 square miles (4,480 km2), across the thinly populated deserts and mountains. It spans an area from south of the San Bernardino Mountains in San Bernardino Valley, to the Nevada border and the Colorado River.

With a population that is 53.7% Hispanic as of 2020, it is California's most populous majority-Hispanic county and the second-largest nationwide.

History

Indigenous 
The indigenous peoples that resided in what is now San Bernardino County were primarily the Taaqtam (Serrano) and ʔívil̃uqaletem (Cahuilla) peoples who lived in the San Bernardino Valley and the San Bernardino Mountains; the Chemehuevi and the Kawaiisu peoples who lived in the Mojave Desert region; and the 'Aha Makhav (Mohave) and the Piipaash (Maricopa) peoples who lived along the Colorado River. These groups established various villages and settlements throughout the region that were interconnected by a series of extensive trails.

Wa'aachnga was a major Tongva village site, also occupied by the Serrano and Cahuilla, located near what is now the city of San Bernardino. The village was part of an extensive trade network along the Mohave Trail that connected villages in San Bernardino County from the Colorado River to the Los Angeles Basin. Wá'peat was a Desert Serrano village located near what is now the city of Hesperia. It was part of a series of villages located along the Mojave River. By the late 1700s, villages in the area were being increasingly encroached upon by Spanish soldiers and missionaries, who were coming into the region from Mission San Gabriel.

Colonial period 
Spanish Missionaries from Mission San Gabriel Arcángel established a church at the village of Wa'aachnga, which would be renamed Politania in 1810. Father Francisco Dumetz named the church San Bernardino on May 20, 1810, after the feast day of St. Bernardino of Siena.  The Franciscans also gave the name San Bernardino to the snowcapped peak in Southern California, in honor of the saint and it is from him that the county derives its name.  In 1819, they established the San Bernardino de Sena Estancia, a mission farm in what is now Redlands.

Following Mexican independence from Spain in 1821, Mexican citizens were granted land grants to establish ranchos in the area of the county. Rancho Jurupa in 1838, Rancho Cucamonga and El Rincon in 1839, Rancho Santa Ana del Chino in 1841, Rancho San Bernardino in 1842 and Rancho Muscupiabe in 1844.

Agua Mansa was the first town in what became San Bernardino County, settled by immigrants from New Mexico on land donated from the Rancho Jurupa in 1841.

Establishment 

Following the purchase of Rancho San Bernardino, and the establishment of the town of San Bernardino in 1851 by Mormon colonists, San Bernardino County was formed in 1853 from parts of Los Angeles County.  Some of the southern parts of the county's territory were given to Riverside County in 1893.

In the 1980s, Northern San Bernardino County proposed to create Mojave County due to the abysmal service levels the county provided.  Ultimately, the vote for county secession failed. The proposed county was from the Cajon Pass to the city of Needles.

In 1998, County administrator James Hlawek resigned after being subject to an FBI investigation for bribery. only after Harry Mays, county Treasurer-Tax Collector Thomas O'Donnell, County Investment Officer Sol Levin and three businessmen had agreed to plead guilty to federal bribery charges.

In 2004, County Supervisor Geral Eaves Pleaded guilty to bribery for accepting gifts from businesses for allowing billboards on county land.

In 2004, the county was embroiled in a corruption scandal, that lasted until 2016, over the colonies housing development with real estate developer Jeff Burum in upland. The scandal resulted in 102 million being paid to Jeff Burums real estate company. Supervisor Bill Postmus pleaded guilty to 10 felonies in regard to his previous post as county assessor.  in 2020, Jeff Burum sued the county again and the county reached for a 69 million dollar settlement. 2022, the county's insurance company, Ironside, balked at paying the settlement, claiming that the county willfully "retaliate against the Colonies II Plaintiffs as part of a decades-long dispute over land and water rights in Upland, California, culminating in a malicious prosecution of Burum."

In 2020, voters approved Measure K, which limited county supervisors to one term instead of three, while reducing pay from 250 thousand dollars to 60 thousand dollars. County Supervisors appealed the decision, only to lose in the state's appeals court. By 2022, term limits were restored and pay was restored to 80% of the annual base compensation for San Bernardino Superior Court judges under a supervisor lead ballot measure

In 2022, The Board of supervisors were pushed by a major supervisor campaign contributor Jeff Burum to vote for secession from the State of California to form the state of Empire.

Geography

It is the largest county by area in California and the largest in the United States (excluding boroughs in Alaska). It is slightly larger than the states of New Jersey, Connecticut, Delaware and Rhode Island combined, and is also slightly larger than Switzerland. It borders both Nevada and Arizona.

The bulk of the population, nearly two million, live in the roughly 480 square miles south of the San Bernardino Mountains adjacent to Riverside and in the San Bernardino Valley in the southwestern portion of the county. About 390,000 residents live just north of the San Bernardino Mountains, in and around the roughly 280 square-mile area that includes the Victor Valley. Roughly another 100,000 people live scattered across the rest of the sprawling county.

The Mojave National Preserve covers some of the eastern desert, especially between Interstate 15 and Interstate 40. The desert portion also includes the cities of Needles next to the Colorado River and Barstow at the junction of Interstate 15 and Interstate 40. Trona is at the northwestern part of the county, west of Death Valley. This national park, mostly within Inyo County, also has a small portion of land within San Bernardino County. The largest metropolitan area in the Mojave Desert part of the county is the Victor Valley, with the incorporated localities of Adelanto, Apple Valley, Hesperia, and Victorville. Further south, a portion of Joshua Tree National Park overlaps the county near the High Desert area, in the vicinity of Twentynine Palms. The remaining towns make up the remainder of the High Desert: Pioneertown, Yucca Valley, Joshua Tree, Landers, and Morongo Valley.

The mountains are home to the San Bernardino National Forest, and include the communities of Crestline, Lake Arrowhead, Running Springs, Big Bear City, Forest Falls, and Big Bear Lake.

The San Bernardino Valley is at the eastern end of the San Gabriel Valley. The San Bernardino Valley includes the cities of Ontario, Chino, Chino Hills, Upland, Fontana, Rialto, Colton, Grand Terrace, Montclair, Rancho Cucamonga, San Bernardino, Loma Linda, Highland, Redlands, and Yucaipa.

Adjacent counties

National protected areas

 Angeles National Forest (part)
 Death Valley National Park (part)
 Havasu National Wildlife Refuge (part)
 Joshua Tree National Park (part)
 Mojave National Preserve
 San Bernardino National Forest (part)
 Sand to Snow National Monument (part)

More than 80% of the county's land is owned by the federal government. There are at least 35 official wilderness areas in the county that are part of the National Wilderness Preservation System. This is the largest number of any county in the United States (although not the largest in total area). The majority are managed by the Bureau of Land Management, but some are integral components of the above listed national protected areas. Most of these wilderness areas lie entirely within the county, but a few are shared with neighboring counties (and two of these are shared with the neighboring states of Arizona and Nevada).

Except as noted, these wilderness areas are managed solely by the Bureau of Land Management and lie within San Bernardino County:

Bigelow Cholla Garden Wilderness
Bighorn Mountain Wilderness (part)
Black Mountain Wilderness
Bristol Mountains Wilderness
Cadiz Dunes Wilderness
Chemehuevi Mountains Wilderness
Cleghorn Lakes Wilderness
Clipper Mountain Wilderness
Cucamonga Wilderness
Dead Mountains Wilderness
Death Valley Wilderness (part)
Golden Valley Wilderness
Grass Valley Wilderness
Havasu Wilderness (part)
Hollow Hills Wilderness
Joshua Tree Wilderness (part)
Kelso Dunes Wilderness
Kingston Range Wilderness
Mesquite Wilderness
Mojave Wilderness
Newberry Mountains Wilderness
North Mesquite Mountains Wilderness
Old Woman Mountains Wilderness
Pahrump Valley Wilderness (part)
Piute Mountains Wilderness
Rodman Mountains Wilderness
Saddle Peak Hills Wilderness (part)
San Gorgonio Wilderness (part)
Sheep Mountain Wilderness (part)
Sheephole Valley Wilderness
Stateline Wilderness
Stepladder Mountains Wilderness
Trilobite Wilderness
Turtle Mountains Wilderness
Whipple Mountains Wilderness

Demographics

2020

2020 census

Note: the US Census treats Hispanic/Latino as an ethnic category. This table excludes Latinos from the racial categories and assigns them to a separate category. Hispanics/Latinos can be of any race.

2011

Places by population, race, and income

2010 Census
The 2010 United States Census reported that San Bernardino County had a population of 2,035,210. The racial makeup of San Bernardino County was 1,153,161 (56.7%) White, 181,862 (8.9%) African American, 22,689 (1.1%) Native American, 128,603 (6.3%) Asian, 6,870 (0.3%) Pacific Islander, 439,661 (21.6%) from other races, and 102,364 (5.0%) from two or more races. Hispanic or Latino of any race were 1,001,145 persons (49.2%).

2000
As of the census of 2000, there were 1,709,434 people, 528,594 households, and 404,374 families residing in the county. There were 601,369 housing units at an average density of 30 per square mile (12/km2). The racial makeup of the county was 58.9% White, 9.1% African American, 1.2% Native American, 4.7% Asian, 0.3% Pacific Islander, 20.8% from other races, and 5.0% from two or more races. 39.2% of the population were Hispanic or Latino of any race. 8.3% were of German, 5.5% English and 5.1% Irish ancestry. 66.1% spoke English, 27.7% Spanish and 1.1% Tagalog as their first language.

There were 528,594 households, out of which 43.7% had children under the age of 18 living with them, 55.8% were married couples living together, 14.8% had a female householder with no husband present, and 23.5% were non-families. 18.4% of all households were made up of individuals, and 6.6% had someone 65 years of age or older living alone.  The average household size was 3.2 people, and the average family size was 3.6 people.

The number of homeless in San Bernardino County grew from 5,270 in 2002 to 7,331 in 2007, a 39% increase.

In the county, the population was spread out—with 32.3% under the age of 18, 10.3% from 18 to 24, 30.2% from 25 to 44, 18.7% from 45 to 64, and 8.6% who were 65 years of age or older.  The median age was 30 years. For every 100 females, there were 99.6 males.  For every 100 females age 18 and over, there were 97.2 males.

The median income for a household in the county was $42,066, and the median income for a family was $46,574. Males had a median income of $37,025 versus $27,993 for females. The per capita income for the county was $16,856.  About 12.6% of families and 15.80% of the population were below the poverty line, including 20.6% of those under age 18 and 8.4% of those age 65 or over.

Government and policing

County government

As of 2021, the Board of Supervisors oversees a $7.9 billion annual budget  and 25,430 employees.

The San Bernardino County Board of Supervisors has 5 members elected from their districts:
 Paul Cook (First District),
 Janice Rutherford (Second District),
 Dawn Rowe (Third District),
 Chairman Curt Hagman (Fourth District), and
 Joe Baca Jr. (Fifth District)

Other County of San Bernardino Elected Officials 

Ensen Mason (Auditor-Controller/Treasurer/Tax Collector)
Bob Dutton (Assessor/Recorder)
 Theodore Alejandre (County Superintendent of Schools)
 Jason Anderson (District Attorney)
 Shannon Dicus (Sheriff/Coroner/Public Administrator)

State and federal representation
In the United States House of Representatives, San Bernardino County is split among 6 congressional districts:
 ,
 ,
 ,
 ,
 , and
 .

In the California State Assembly, San Bernardino County is split among 8 assembly districts:
 ,
 ,
 ,
 ,
 ,
 ,
 , and
 .

In the California State Senate, San Bernardino County is split among 5 districts:
 ,
 ,
 ,
 , and
 .

Policing

Sheriff
The San Bernardino County Sheriff provides court protection, jail administration, and coroner services for all of San Bernardino County. It provides police patrol, detective, and marshal services for the unincorporated areas of the county.

Municipal police
Municipal police departments in the county are: Fontana, San Bernardino, Rialto, Ontario, Upland, Montclair, Chino, Redlands, Colton, and Barstow. The San Bernardino County Sheriff provides contract law enforcement services to 14 incorporated cities and towns: Adelanto, Apple Valley, Big Bear, Chino Hills, Grand Terrace, Hesperia, Highland, Loma Linda, Needles, Rancho Cucamonga, Twentynine Palms, Victorville, Yucaipa, and Yucca Valley. Also for the San Manuel Band of Mission Indians. The Sheriff's Commanders assigned to these stations acts as each municipality's Chief of Police.

Politics

Voter registration

Cities by population and voter registration

Overview

San Bernardino County is a county in which candidates from both major political parties have won in recent elections. Democrat Hillary Clinton carried the county by a majority and by double digits in 2016. The Democratic Party also carried the county in 2008 and 2012, when Barack Obama won majorities of the county's votes, and in 1992 and 1996, when Bill Clinton won pluralities. Republican George W. Bush took the county in 2000 by a plurality and in 2004 by a majority. The county is split between heavily Latino, middle-class, and Democratic areas and more wealthy conservative areas. The heavily Latino cities of Ontario and San Bernardino went for John Kerry in 2004, but with a relatively low voter turnout. In 2006, San Bernardino's population exceeded 201,000, and in 2004, only 42,520 votes were cast in the city; in 2006, strongly Republican Rancho Cucamonga had over 145,000 residents, of whom 53,054 voted.

According to the California Secretary of State, as of February 2020, there were 1,016,190 registered voters in San Bernardino County. Of those, 410,197 (40.37%) were registered Democrats, 298,234 (29.35%) were registered Republicans, with the remainder belonging to minor political parties or declining to state.

On November 4, 2008, San Bernardino County voted 67% for Proposition 8, which amended the California Constitution to ban same-sex marriages.

Public safety

Law enforcement

The current district attorney is Jason Anderson, who was elected in March 2018 and took office on January 1, 2019.

The county's primary law enforcement agency is the San Bernardino County Sheriff's Department. The department provides law enforcement services in the unincorporated areas of the county and in 14 contract cities, operates the county jail system, provides marshal services in the county superior courts, and has numerous other divisions to serve the residents of the county.

Fire rescue
The county operates the San Bernardino County Consolidated Fire District (commonly known as the San Bernardino County Fire Department).  The department provides "all-risk" fire, rescue, and emergency medical services to all unincorporated areas in the county except for several areas served by independent fire protection districts, and several cities that chose to contract with the department.

Crime
The following table includes the number of incidents reported and the rate per 1,000 persons for each type of offense.

On December 2, 2015, in the city of San Bernardino, terrorists attacked a staff meeting being held in the Inland Regional Center, murdering 14 people and wounding 22.

Cities by population and crime rates

Education

Colleges and universities
 Barstow Community College
 Brandman University (Ontario campus)
 California State University, San Bernardino
 California University of Science and Medicine
 Chaffey College
 Copper Mountain College
 Crafton Hills College
 Loma Linda University
 National University (campuses in Ontario and San Bernardino)
 Palo Verde Community College (Needles campus)
 San Bernardino Valley College
 University of Redlands
 Victor Valley College

K-12 education
School districts are:

Unified:

 Apple Valley Unified School District
 Baker Valley Unified School District
 Barstow Unified School District
 Bear Valley Unified School District
 Beaumont Unified School District
 Chino Valley Unified School District
 Colton Joint Unified School District
 Fontana Unified School District
 Hesperia Unified School District
 Lucerne Valley Unified School District
 Morongo Unified School District
 Muroc Joint Unified School District
 Needles Unified School District
 Redlands Unified School District
 Rialto Unified School District
 Rim of the World Unified School District
 San Bernardino City Unified School District
 Sierra Sands Unified School District
 Silver Valley Unified School District
 Snowline Joint Unified School District
 Trona Joint Unified School District
 Upland Unified School District
 Yucaipa-Calimesa Joint Unified School District

Secondary:
 Chaffey Joint Union High School District
 Victor Valley Union High School District

Elementary:

 Adelanto Elementary School District
 Alta Loma Elementary School District
 Central Elementary School District
 Cucamonga Elementary School District
 Etiwanda Elementary School District
 Helendale Elementary School District
 Mountain View Elementary School District
 Mount Baldy Joint Elementary School District
 Ontario-Montclair School District
 Oro Grande Elementary School District
 Victor Elementary School District

Libraries
The San Bernardino County Library System consists of 32 branches across the county. Library services offered vary from branch to branch, but include internet access, children's story times, adult literacy services, book clubs, classes, and special events. The library system also offers e-books, digital music and movie downloads, free access to online learning through Lynda.com, and many other digital services.

City-sponsored public libraries also exist in San Bernardino County, including A. K. Smiley Public Library in Redlands, California, which was built in 1898. Other public libraries in the County include: The San Bernardino City Public Library System, Rancho Cucamonga Public Library, Upland Public Library, Colton City Library, and the Ontario City Library. These libraries are separate from the county system and do not share circulation privileges.

Transportation

Major highways

Public transportation
Morongo Basin Transit Authority provides bus service in Yucca Valley, Joshua Tree and Twentynine Palms (including the Marine base). Limited service is also provided to Palm Springs.
Mountain Transit covers the Lake Arrowhead and Big Bear regions. Limited service is also provided to Downtown San Bernardino.
Needles Area Transit serves Needles and the surrounding county area.
Omnitrans provides transit service in the urbanized portion of San Bernardino County, serving the City of San Bernardino, as well as the area between Montclair and Yucaipa.
Victor Valley Transit Authority operates buses in Victorville, Hesperia, Adelanto, Apple Valley and the surrounding county area.
Foothill Transit connects the Inland Empire area to the San Gabriel Valley and downtown Los Angeles.
RTA connects Montclair, and Anaheim to Riverside County.
SunLine Transit Agency connects Cal State San Bernardino to Palm Springs
Beaumont Transit Connects Downtown San Bernardino to the city of Beaumont and Banning
San Bernardino County is also served by Greyhound buses and Amtrak trains. Metrolink commuter trains connect the urbanized portion of the county with Los Angeles, Orange, and Riverside Counties.

Airports
 Commercial domestic and international passenger flights are available at San Bernardino International Airport (SBD) and Ontario International Airport (ONT). SBD can be accessed from I-215 via Mill Street, I-10 via Tippecanoe Avenue, and I-210 via 3rd Street. Terminal construction recently finished, and commercial flights began in 2022. There is also a logistics center for Amazon's Amazon Air service that has recently completed construction on the airport grounds.
 Southern California Logistics Airport (Victorville) is a major airplane graveyard, general aviation airport, and a Partial Air Force Installation.
 The County of San Bernardino owns six general aviation airports: Apple Valley Airport, Baker Airport, Barstow-Daggett Airport, Chino Airport, Needles Airport, and Twentynine Palms Airport.
 Other general aviation airports in the county include: Big Bear City Airport, Cable Airport (Upland), Hesperia Airport (not listed in NPIAS), and Redlands Municipal Airport

Environmental quality
California Attorney General Jerry Brown sued the county in April 2007 under the state's environmental quality act for failing to account for the impact of global warming in the county's 25-year growth plan, approved in March. The Center for Biological Diversity, the Sierra Club and the Audubon Society also sued in a separate case. According to Brendan Cummings, a senior attorney for the plaintiffs: "San Bernardino has never seen a project it didn't like. They rubber-stamp development. It's very much of a frontier mentality." The plaintiffs want the county to rewrite its growth plan's environmental impact statement to include methods to measure greenhouse gases and take steps to reduce them.

According to county spokesman David Wert, only 15% of the county is controlled by the county; the rest is cities and federal and state land. However, the county says it will make sure employment centers and housing are near transportation corridors to reduce traffic and do more to promote compact development and mass transit. The county budgeted $325,000 to fight the lawsuit.

The state and the county reached a settlement in August 2007. The county agreed to amend its general plan to include a Greenhouse Gas Emissions Reduction Plan, including an emission inventory and reduction targets. According to the LA Times in 2015, San Bernardino County had the highest levels of ozone in the United States, averaging 102 parts per billion.

Communities

Cities

Census-designated places

Baker
Big Bear City
Big River
Bloomington
Bluewater
Crestline
Fort Irwin
Homestead Valley
Joshua Tree
Lake Arrowhead
Lenwood
Lucerne Valley
Lytle Creek
Mentone
Morongo Valley
Mountain View Acres
Muscoy
Oak Glen
Oak Hills
Phelan
Piñon Hills
Running Springs
San Antonio Heights
Searles Valley
Silver Lakes
Spring Valley Lake
Wrightwood
Yermo

Unincorporated communities

Amboy
Angelus Oaks
Argus
Arrowbear Lake
Arrowhead Farms
Arrowhead Highlands
Arrowhead Junction
Baldwin Lake
Baldy Mesa
Bell Mountain
Blue Jay
Bryman
Cadiz
Cajon Junction
Cedar Glen
Cedarpines Park
Cima
Crafton
Crest Park
Cushenbury
Daggett
Danby
Earp
El Mirage
Essex
Fawnskin
Fenner
Forest Falls
Goffs
Green Valley Lake
Halloran Springs
Havasu Lake
Helendale
Hinkley
Hodge
Johnson Valley
Kingston
Kramer
Kramer Hills
La Delta
Landers
Ludlow
Mars
Midway
Mojave Heights
Mount Baldy
Mountain Home Village
Mountain Pass
Newberry Springs
Nipton
Oro Grande
Parker Dam
Patton
Pioneer Point
Pioneertown
Red Mountain
Rimforest
Skyforest
Sugarloaf
Sunfair
Sunfair Heights
Trona
Twentynine Palms Base
Twin Peaks
Venus
Vidal
Vidal Junction
Wonder Valley
Zzyzx

Indian reservations
Chemehuevi Indian Reservation
Colorado River Indian Reservation (partially in Riverside County, and La Paz County, Arizona)
Fort Mojave Indian Reservation (partially in Mohave County, Arizona, and Clark County, Nevada)
San Manuel Indian Reservation
Twenty-Nine Palms Indian Reservation (partially in Riverside County)

Ghost towns
Afton
Rice
Siberia
Calico 
Amboy
Ash Hill 
Ludlow
Cadiz
Klondike
Ivanpah
Keenbrook
Cosy Dell

Population ranking
The population ranking of the following table is based on the 2020 census of San Bernardino County.

† county seat

Places of interest 
Auto Club Speedway in Fontana, California
Calico Ghost Town — northeast of Barstow via Interstate 15
Zzyzx — a small desert settlement that used to be a health spa and is now the Desert Studies Center
Downtown San Bernardino
Mojave Narrows Park
Mojave National Preserve
Mojave Trails National Monument
Joshua Tree National Park
 Castle Mountains National Monument
 Sand to Snow National Monument
San Bernardino National Forest — home to Big Bear Lake outdoor activities
Goldstone Deep Space Communications Complex
Mitchell Caverns
Snow Summit, Bear Mountain (Ski Area), and Snow Valley Mountain Resort are home to Southern California's premier winter ski resorts. Mountain High, although technically located in Los Angeles County, is also an alternative to Snow Summit and Bear Mountain because of its proximity to San Bernardino County.
The Pacific Crest Trail, officially designated as the Pacific Crest National Scenic Trail (PCT), passes through San Bernardino County.

See also

 List of California counties
 List of cemeteries in San Bernardino County
 List of museums in the Inland Empire (California) 
 List of school districts in San Bernardino County, California
 National Register of Historic Places listings in San Bernardino County, California

Newspapers, past and present
 Chino Champion, Chino
 Daily Press, Victorville
 The Daily Report, Ontario
 Desert Dispatch, Barstow
 Desert Star, Needles
 The Desert Trail, Twentynine Palms
 Hi-Desert Star, Yucca Valley
 Inland Valley Daily Bulletin, Rancho Cucamonga
 News Mirror, Yucaipa
 Redlands Daily Facts, Redlands
 The San Bernardino Sun, San Bernardino
 Big Bear Grizzly, Big Bear Lake
 Upland News, Upland

Notes

References

External links

 
 San Bernardino County Museum website
 San Bernardino County Museum at Google Cultural Institute
 San Bernardino County Library website

 
California counties
Counties in Southern California
Greater Los Angeles
Inland Empire
1853 establishments in California
Populated places established in 1853
Majority-minority counties in California